Sochta Pakistan is a TV talk show on PTV news channel in Pakistan. It was started in April, 2011 by Moeed Pirzada, who also hosts the show. It is an analytical and discussion based talk show which provides a platform for think tank members, strategic experts, economists, diplomats and people from different walks of life in Pakistan and other countries.

Interviewees on the programme include Hillary Clinton, Hamid Karzai, Sayeeda Warsi, Hina Rabbani Khar, and Yasin Malik.

References 

Pakistan Television Corporation original programming
2011 Pakistani television series debuts
2012 Pakistani television series endings
Urdu-language television shows
English-language television shows
Pakistani television talk shows